Bill Guttentag is an American dramatic and documentary film writer-producer-director. His films have premiered at the Sundance, Cannes, Telluride and Tribeca film festivals, and he has won two Academy Awards.

Career
Guttentag won an Oscar for Best Documentary with his HBO film You Don't Have to Die, telling the story of one boy's battle against cancer. Guttentag would receive three more Oscar nominations before winning another Oscar for his 2002 documentary Twin Towers.

In 2007, Guttentag directed two films – Live!, which premiered at Tribeca Film Festival, starring Eva Mendes, Andre Braugher David Krumholtz, Jeffrey Dean Morgan, Michelle Krusiec, and Jay Hernandez; and Nanking, which premiered at the Sundance Film Festival, a documentary about the Rape of Nanking during World War II. Nanking featured Woody Harrelson, Mariel Hemingway, Rosalind Chao, Stephen Dorff, and Jürgen Prochnow. It was shortlisted for an Academy Award, won awards at Sundance Film Festival and other film festivals, earned Guttentag a Writers Guild of America Award nomination for Best Documentary Screenplay. The film went on to become the highest grossing theatrical documentary in Chinese history. Nanking was nominated for 3 Emmy Awards and won one Emmy Award. The film also won a George Foster Peabody Award in 2009.

Live! had its American premiere at the Tribeca Film Festival and its international premiere at the Deauville Film Festival, and was distributed in the US by The Weinstein Company. Its international distribution included Lions Gate Entertainment (UK) and Pretty Pictures (France). Live! was produced by Charles Roven and Atlas Entertainment.

Guttentag partnered with Richard Linklater on That Animal Rescue Show, on which they were executive producers and directors. The 10-part series, made for CBS All Access, premiered in October, 2020. An episode from the series was part of the official selection of the 2020 Telluride Film Festival.

Guttentag created and executive produced the NBC series Crime & Punishment, which ran for three seasons, 2002–2004. Guttentag was also a director on the series. The show, a non-fiction spin-off of the Law & Order franchise, followed District Attorneys in San Diego County, California. The series was created with Dick Wolf, who was also an executive producer. Over the series' run, most shows were in the Nielsen top 20, and several were in the top 10.

His novel Boulevard, was published by Pegasus Books/W. W. Norton in 2011, and the French edition was published by Éditions Gallimard (2013), where it was a finalist for the Grand Prix de Littérature Policière. He also co-wrote Masters of Disaster: The Ten Commandments of Damage Control, with Democratic political consultant and presidential advisor Chris Lehane, which was published in December 2012 by Palgrave Macmillan. He has also written nonfiction pieces, including for The Wall Street Journal and the Los Angeles Times.

Guttentag also directed Soundtrack for a Revolution, a film about music and the Civil Rights Movement. The film features performances by John Legend, Joss Stone, The Roots, Blind Boys of Alabama, Richie Havens, Mary Mary, Anthony Hamilton and Wyclef Jean. Soundtrack for a Revolution had its international premiere at the 2009 Cannes Film Festival, and its US premiere at Tribeca Film festival. The film was produced and distributed internationally by Wild Bunch and released theatrically in the U.S. by Area 23a, and later aired on PBS. Guttentag was nominated for WGA and Producers Guild Awards for the film, which also won awards at US and international film festivals. The film was short-listed for an Academy Award.

Guttentag's film, Knife Fight, which he directed and also wrote (with political consultant Chris Lehane), stars Rob Lowe, Jamie Chung, Julie Bowen, Carrie-Anne Moss, David Harbour, Eric McCormack, Jennifer Morrison, Michelle Krusiec, and Saffron Burrows. The film is about a Democratic political consultant and was released by IFC in January 2013. The film premiered at the 2012 Tribeca Film Festival, and also had special screenings at the 2012 Democratic National Convention and the John F. Kennedy School of Government.

Guttentag has directed commercials and other work for a number of Silicon Valley companies, including Google, Yahoo!, and MasterClass. He has been an advisor to MasterClass since before the company’s launch and he directed the premiere class with author James Patterson. He also directed the third class with tennis star Serena Williams.

He has directed 8 films for HBO or Cinemax, including Nanking and Only the Dead See the End of War.

Guttentag has served on a number of film festival juries, including the Shanghai International Film Festival, The Odesa International Film Festival and the Morelia International Film Festival.

His film Only the Dead See the End of War premiered at the 2015 Telluride Film Festival and premiered on HBO in March 2016. He won an AACTA Award (Australian Academy Award) for Best Directing for a Documentary, and a Walkley Award (Australian Pulitzer) for the film. The film also won an AACTA for Best Documentary and was nominated for an Emmy Award in 2017.

Guttentag has shown his films and given lectures at many US and international universities, including: Yale, Harvard, the University of California, Berkeley; University of California, Los Angeles; the University of Pennsylvania; Peking University; Tsinghua University; Fudan University; Kyoto University; the Hong Kong Academy of Performing Arts; HEC Paris; and the Freie Universität Berlin. Other screenings include The Academy of Motion Picture Arts and Sciences; The Council on Foreign Relations; the Paley Center for Media; and the Brooklyn Academy of Music.

Accolades
Guttentag's films have been selected for Sundance three times, Tribeca five times, Telluride twice, and have won awards at numerous American and international film festivals. They have also received a number of special screenings internationally and in the US, including at the Museum of Modern Art in New York, the Stanford Law School, the Harvard Kennedy School, and the White House.

Guttentag has received two Academy Awards, three additional Academy Award nominations, a Peabody Award, three Emmy Awards, two additional Emmy nominations, two Writers Guild Award nominations, a Producers Guild Award nomination, and a Robert F. Kennedy Journalism Award.

He taught at the Hasso Plattner Institute of Design at Stanford (d.school).

Guttentag has been a lecturer at the Stanford Graduate School of Business since 2001.

Selected filmography

You Don't Have to Die (1988)
Crack USA: County Under Siege (1989)
The Cocaine War: Lost in Bolivia (1992)
Assassinated: the Last Days of Kennedy and King (1998)
Crime & Punishment (2002)
Twin Towers (2002)
Live! (2007)
Nanking (2007)
Soundtrack for a Revolution (2009)
Knife Fight (2012)
Only the Dead (2015)
Sublime (2019)
 That Animal Rescue Show (2020)
 Groomed (2021)

References

External links
 

American film producers
Living people
Directors of Best Documentary Short Subject Academy Award winners
American film directors
Year of birth missing (living people)